A total of 41 counties, along with the municipality of Bucharest, constitute the official administrative divisions of Romania. They represent the country's NUTS-3 (Nomenclature of Territorial Units for Statistics – Level 3) statistical subdivisions within the European Union and each of them serves as the local level of government within its borders. Most counties are named after a major river, while some are named after notable cities within them, such as the county seat.

The earliest organization into județe of the Principalities of Wallachia and Moldavia (where they were termed ținuturi) dates back to at least the late 14th century. For most of the time since modern Romania was formed in 1859, the administrative division system has been similar to that of the French departments. The system has since  changed several times and the number of counties has varied over time, from the 71 județe that existed before World War II to only 39 after 1968. The current format has largely been in place since 1968 as only small changes have been made since then, the last of which was in 1997.

According to a 2011 census data from the National Institute of Statistics, the average population of Romania's 41 counties is about 445,000, with Iași County as the most populous (772,000) and Covasna County (210,000) the least.

History

The earliest organization into județe (for Wallachia), and ținuturi (for Moldavia), dates back at least to the late 14th century.  Inspired from the organization of the late Byzantine Empire, each județ was ruled by a jude (or pârcălab for a ținut), a person officially appointed with administrative and judicial functions. Transylvania was divided into royal counties headed by comes (royal counts) with administrative and judicial functions.

After modern Romania was formed in 1859 through the union of Wallachia and the rump of Moldavia, the administrative division was modernized using the French administrative system as a model, with județ as the basic administrative unit. Aside from the 1950–1968 period, this system has remained in place until today. Since 1864, for each județ there exists a prefect, a subordinate of the Ministry of Internal Affairs and representative of the government inside the county; he is also the head of local administration for areas not delegated to local authorities. Until 1948, each județ was further divided into several plăși, each administered by a pretor.

After the adoption of a new Constitution in 1923, the traditional local administrative systems of the newly acquired regions of Transylvania, Bukovina and Bessarabia were made uniform in 1925 with that of the Romanian Old Kingdom. County borders were kept largely intact, with few adjustments, and the total number of counties was raised to 71; this lasted until the beginning of World War II.

In 1938, King Carol II modified the law on the administration of the Romanian territory according to the fascist model. Ten ținuturi (approx. translation "lands") were created, ruled by Rezidenți Regali (Royal Residents), appointed directly by the Monarch. The ținuturi represented another layer of administration between counties and the country, as the county borders were not erased.

Due to the territorial changes during World War II, this style of administration did not last, and the administration at the județ level was reintroduced after the war. Between 1941 and 1944, Romania administered the territory between the Dniester and Southern Bug rivers known as Transnistria, which consisted of 13 separate counties.

After taking over the administration of the country in 1945, the Communist Party changed the administrative model to that of the Soviet Union (regions and raions) in 1950, but changed it back in 1968. Nevertheless, the county borders set then were quite different from those present during the interbellum, as only 39 counties were formed from the 56 remaining after the war.

In 1981, Giurgiu and Călărași were split from Ialomița and the former county of Ilfov, while in 1997, Ilfov County, which had been a dependency of the municipality of Bucharest for nearly two decades, was reinstated. The county borders set in 1968 are still largely in place today, but the functions of different authorities have changed due to administrative reforms in the 1990s.

At present, Romania is divided into 41 counties and one municipality (Bucharest); these are assigned as the NUTS-3 geocode statistical subdivision scheme of Romania within the European Union. Each of the counties is further divided into cities (some of which have municipality status) and communes. The prefect and his administration have executive prerogatives within the county limits, while limited legislative powers are assigned to a County Council elected every four years during local elections. The territorial districts of the Romanian judicial system overlap with county borders, thus avoiding further complication in the separation of powers on the government.

Current list

See also 

 Communes of Romania
 Development regions of Romania
 List of Romania county name etymologies
 Former administrative divisions of Romania
 List of Romanian counties by population
 List of cities and towns in Romania
 List of Romanian counties by foreign trade
 Municipiu

Notes

References

External links
Blog of the Romanian Royalty House showing various maps with the previous administrative divisions of Romania. 
Current and historical divisions of Romania at Statoids.com

 
Counties
Romania 1
Counties, Romania
Romania geography-related lists